Sir William Godfrey, 1st Baronet (1739 – 1817) was an Anglo-Irish member of the Irish House of Commons.

Godfrey was the son of John Godfrey, Esquire and Barbara, the daughter of Reverend Hathway. He was a great-grandson of Thomas Coningsby, 1st Earl Coningsby and his family owned a sizeable estate in County Kerry.

He served as High Sheriff of Kerry in 1780. He was Member of Parliament for Tralee between 1785 and 1790. On 17 June 1785, he was created a baronet, of Bushfield in County Kerry. He subsequently served as MP for Belfast between 1792 and 1797. Godfrey rebuilt the family home at Bushfield House, renaming it Kicolman Abbey in reference to the family's ownership of Killagha Abbey.

Godfrey married Agnes, the only daughter of William Blennerhassett, on 15 August 1761. Together they had nine children. He was succeeded in his titles by his eldest son, John.

References

1739 births
1817 deaths
People from County Kerry
Members of the Parliament of Ireland (pre-1801) for County Kerry constituencies
Irish MPs 1783–1790
Irish MPs 1790–1797
18th-century Anglo-Irish people
Baronets in the Baronetage of Ireland
Members of the Parliament of Ireland (pre-1801) for Belfast